His Last Walk is the debut studio album by American metalcore band Blessthefall. The album was released on April 10, 2007. It is the only studio album by the band to feature original vocalist Craig Mabbitt, who would later be replaced by Beau Bokan. The album was released before Blessthefall started to play on the Taste of Chaos tour. The last song, "His Last Walk", features a hidden track called "Purple Dog", which is a joke song made by the band members in which all members sing the song and clap their hands.

The album was re-released through Ferret Music, featuring an acoustic version of "Rise Up" and "I Wouldn't Quit If Everyone Quit" as bonus tracks, the latter of which was previously released as a stand-alone single.

Track listing

Personnel
Blessthefall
 Craig Mabbitt – lead vocals
 Eric Lambert – lead guitar
 Mike Frisby – rhythm guitar
 Jared Warth – bass, additional unclean vocals, keyboards, programming
 Matt Traynor – drums, percussion

Additional
Cory Spotts – producer, engineer, mixing
Blessthefall – producer
Joe Cotela – additional vocals on track 4
Marty Welker – drum technician
Brian Trummel – artwork
Tim Harmon – photography
Stewart Teggart – management

Charts

References

2007 debut albums
Blessthefall albums
Fearless Records albums